Marios Iliopoulos can refer to:

 Marios Iliopoulos (musician) - a Greek–Australian heavy metal musician
 Marios Iliopoulos (businessman) - a Greek businessman who was the beneficial owner of the ship Brillante Virtuoso and who was found in court to have been involved with its destruction for the purposes of insurance fraud